Synersaga is a genus of moths in the family Lecithoceridae.

Species
Synersaga atriptera (Xu & Wang, 2014)
Synersaga bleszynskii (Gozmány, 1978)
Synersaga breviclavata Liu & Wang, 2014
Synersaga brevidigitata Liu & Wang, 2014
Synersaga caradjai (Gozmány, 1978)
Synersaga kuni Park, 2007
Synersaga mondulkiriensis Park & Bae, 2012
Synersaga nigriptera Park, 2007
Synersaga phuruaensis Park, 2009
Synersaga pseudocathra (Diakonoff, 1951)

References

External links
Natural History Museum Lepidoptera genus database

 
Lecithocerinae
Moth genera